Juan de la O (born July 24, 1966) is a Mexican indoor soccer goalkeeper who played in several U.S. indoor leagues. He was the 1997 Continental Indoor Soccer League Goalkeeper of the Year.

De La O began his indoor career in the Mexican indoor soccer leagues. In 1995, he played for the Mexico Toros of the Continental Indoor Soccer League. The team lasted only that one season before folding and the Seattle SeaDogs selected De La O in the CISL dispersal draft. He played the next two seasons with the SeaDogs. He was the 1996 CISL Goalkeeper of the Year. In 1997, the SeaDogs won the CISL championships as De La O was named the Championship Series MVP. When the CISL collapsed at the end of the 1997 season, D La O held the league record for lowest goals against average. Where the CISL had played a summer indoor season, the National Professional Soccer League played a winter indoor season. De La O therefore, moved to the Philadelphia KiXX of the NPSL in the fall of 1997. In 1998, several ex-CISL formed a new league, named the Premier Soccer Alliance. De La O signed with the Portland Pythons for the 1998 PSA season but was back in the NPSL that fall, this time with the Florida ThunderCats. In 1999, he played for the Houston Hotshots in the PSA, now known as the World Indoor Soccer League. He moved again for the 2000 WISL season, this time playing for the Arizona Thunder. He recorded the first two shutouts in WISL history. It appears he may have finished his U.S. career in 2001 with the Sacramento Knights. However, he may have continued to play in Mexico. BiChampion with “El Combinado” at ITAM (2017-2018).

References

1966 births
Living people
Arizona Thunder players
Continental Indoor Soccer League players
Expatriate soccer players in the United States
Florida ThunderCats players
Footballers from Mexico City
Association football goalkeepers
Houston Hotshots players
Mexican expatriate footballers
Mexican footballers
Mexico Toros players
National Professional Soccer League (1984–2001) players
Philadelphia KiXX (NPSL) players
Premier Soccer Alliance players
Portland Pythons players
Sacramento Knights players
Seattle SeaDogs players
World Indoor Soccer League players